The Lake County Round Sale Barn is a building located in Lakeview, Oregon listed on the National Register of Historic Places. The barn was added to the list on November 21, 2003.

See also
 National Register of Historic Places listings in Lake County, Oregon

References

1942 establishments in Oregon
Barns on the National Register of Historic Places in Oregon
Buildings and structures completed in 1942
Buildings and structures in Lakeview, Oregon
National Register of Historic Places in Lake County, Oregon
Round barns in Oregon
Sale barns in the United States